Banneker Recreation Center is an historic structure located in the Columbia Heights neighborhood of Washington, D.C.  The building was built in 1934 and was named for Benjamin Banneker, a free African American who assisted in the survey of boundaries of the original District of Columba in 1791.  It was known as a premier African American recreation center in the city.    It was listed on the District of Columbia Inventory of Historic Sites in 1985 and it was listed on the National Register of Historic Places in 1986.  The structure currently houses the Banneker Community Center, a unit of the District of Columbia Department of Parks and Recreation.

References

External links

Columbia Heights, Washington, D.C.
Buildings and structures completed in 1934
1934 establishments in Washington, D.C.
Colonial Revival architecture in Washington, D.C.
African-American history of Washington, D.C.
Event venues on the National Register of Historic Places in Washington, D.C.
Benjamin Banneker